Rodrigo Alvarez de la Cadena (born 3 January 1988) is a  Mexican singer, performer, songwriter, radio host and musician. He is best known for his performances with a variety of worldwide artists and performers. He is also the host of a live radio show in which he performs and introduces audiences to his music.

Biography
Rodrigo de la Cadena has become a multifaceted young artist, passionate by the Golden Age of romantic music (Agustín Lara, Gonzalo Curiel, María Grever, Los Panchos, Pedro Vargas, Amparo Montes, and Álvaro Carrillo), becoming the most faithful lover and present impeller of Bolero music, having a repertoire of more than 900 songs as well as his own original material.

Rodrigo not only has had the professional support of artists like Armando Manzanero, Roberto Cantoral, Lucho Gatica, Carlos Lico, Imelda Miller, Enrique Chia, Gualberto Castro, Chamin Correa, the late Pepe Jara, José José, among others which he has worked several times but has their unconditional friendship and support, something that very few artists have these days.

Rodrigo has his very own radio show "nuevamente... bolero" every Saturday from 9:00pm to 11:00pm on Radio Trece 1290 am which goes out to almost every city in the Mexican Republic, offering two straight hours of romance and memories of the great years of romantic bolero music with special guests every night.

He has performed in Mexico City's major stages such as the National Auditorium, Metropolitan Theatre, Libanes Theatre, Universidad Nacional Autónoma de México (UNAM), La Salle University; as well as in the most important hotels and night clubs in Mexico City such as The Sheraton Hotel and The Mayan Palace Hotel, the Gabanna night club and the Bar Prim.

Rodrigo has recorded two official albums, the first one called "Nuevamente... El Bolero" which was recorded in the studios of the album's label Orfeón offers songs by the most influential songwriters of bolero music and contains 12 tracks which were chosen out of 30 studio recordings.

Rodrigo after quitting his label Orfeon goes back to his very first recordings with Alejandro Hernández and starts recording his second album "Boleros Con Orquesta" with his very own orquestra and releases it as independent.

"It has always been a dream to make a project of boleros in big band and specially putting it on record and with my very own orchestra, everything turned out even better that I expected", says the young artist who not only played piano, guitar and sang in every recording, but also produced the album and arranged the music. Throwing a little bit of poetry in this new album, Rodrigo lets his feelings show by reciting words of Amado Nervo and Martin Galas giving the album more romance.

Rodrigo not only has been invited to every International Festival Of Bolero that has happened in the last few years in the Mexican Republic but has been invited to perform in the same festival in countries like Ecuador, Cuba, Argentina, Panama, among others, offering several presentations in the most important stages these countries have to offer.

He also performed in Europe, and, in 2014, became the Grand Prix Winner of the International Festival of Arts Slavianski Bazaar in Vitebsk, Belarus.

Rodrigo is now doing presentations in Miami, San Antonio, Mérida, and Ecuador, as well as recording his third record which will include for the first time new original material written by Rodrigo as well as a duet with Carlos Lico.

Discography
 Nuevamente... El Bolero (2005) - Orfeón Videovox
 Boleros con Orquesta (2007) - Discos Continental
 La Bohemia del Amor (2008) - Discos Continental
 Neobolero / Un loco como yo (2010) - Discos Continental
 Agustín Lara: La Hora Íntima (Vol.1) (2013) - Discos Continental
 Agustín Lara: La Hora Íntima (Vol.2) (2013) - Discos Continental
 Agustín Lara: La Hora Íntima (Vol.3) (2013) - Discos Continental
 El Bolero de mi vida: Cuando nace una canción (CD1) (2017) - Independiente
 El Bolero de mi vida: Boleros para extañarte mejor (CD2) (2017) - Independiente
 Lo que me piden mis amigos (2018) - Independiente

References

Official Website

External links
 Official Rodrigo de La Cadena site
 Rodrigo de la Cadena's profile on Radio Trece

1988 births
Living people
Mexican male singer-songwriters
Mexican singer-songwriters
21st-century Mexican singers
21st-century Mexican male singers
Slavianski Bazaar winners